Tanami may refer to.

Places
Tanami (IBRA region), a biogeographic region in Australia 
Tanami, Northern Territory, a locality in Australia
Tanami Desert, a desert in Australia
Tanami Downs, a pastoral lease in Australia
Tanami Road, a road in Australia
Tanami Station, a railway station in Japan
Tanami Track, traverses the Tanami Desert in Australia

People
Kōji Tanami, a Japanese banker

Other uses
Tanami East, Northern Territory, a locality in Australia
North Tanami Band, a reggae/ska band
Tanami toadlet, a species of frog